Lehereni Gewog is a former gewog (village block) of Samtse District, Bhutan. Lehereni Gewog comprises part of Sipsu Dungkhag (sub-district), together with Tendu, Biru, Bara, and Sipsu Gewogs.

References 

Former gewogs of Bhutan
Samtse District